Bahman Mirza (‎ 11 October 1810 – 11 February 1884) was an Iranian prince from the Qajar dynasty. The son of Abbas Mirza and grandson of Fath Ali Shah, he was Vicergerent (vali) of Azerbaijan and Governor-General of Tabriz. He later migrated to neighboring Imperial Russia, where he was received with great honour and lived a prestigious life in Shusha. Many of his offspring either returned to Iran where they pursued political or military careers, or served in the Russian military, and later played an important role in the military of Azerbaijan Democratic Republic. He is also the great-grandfather of Afrasiyab Badalbeyli, Azerbaijani composer and author of the first Azerbaijani balet and  the first ballet in the Muslim East.

Bahman Mirza is the ancestor of the Bahmani family with the branches of the Russian Princes Persidskii, and the Bahmanov and Kadjar lines of Azerbaijan as well as of the Iranian families Bahmani-Qajar and Bahman. Thus, Bahman Mirza was also the (great-)grandfather of Ambassador Ali Akbar Bahman.

Life
Bahman Mirza, influenced by the European Enlightenment, was the fourth son of Prince Abbas Mirza, viceroy (nayeb os-saltaneh) and crown prince (vali ahd) of Fath Ali Shah by his first wife and cousin, Assiyeh Khanom, daughter of Amir Mohammad Khan Qajar-Davallu, the queen mother. Thus, with the younger Ghahreman Mirza he was the only full brother of Mohammad Shah Qajar. Bahman Mirza was born in Golestan Palace at Tehran on 11 October 1810 and educated privately in Tabriz. 1831 to 1834 he was appointed governor (hakem) of Ardabil, in 1834 governor of Tehran and commander-in-chief (sepah-salar), then governor-general (beglerbegi) of Borujerd and Silakhor, and governor of Hamadan from 1834 to 1841. After the death of his brother Ghahreman Mirza in 1839 he succeeded him as prince-governor of Azerbaijan in 1841, but was forced to resign and exiled to Tiflis in 1848 due to political intrigues at court. He moved to Shusha in the Russian occupied Karabakh region in 1853 and died there on 11 February 1884. He was buried in his mausoleum at the cemetery in Barda, near Shusha.

Bahman Mirza was an able governor, well-educated and a patron of literature and art, interested in geography, European history and modern natural history. He gave scholars, poets and artists a special place of honour. Therefore, authors and translators dedicated many works to him. The first Persian translation of One Thousand and One Nights from Arabic was translated by Abdol-Latif Tasooji by the order of Bahman Mirza.

From 1831, the birth of Nasir al-Din Shah, to 1853, the birth of Muzaffar al-Din Shah, Bahman Mirza played a key role in the royal line of succession, when Great Britain and Russia began to intervene in Persia's domestic affairs. Both European powers saw Bahman Mirza as the powerful and strong senior prince of the imperial house, able to take the crown after his ill-fated brother. Thus, the right of succession of weak infant crown princes was legal according to the Qajar rule of succession, though it seemed sometimes not very realistic. But at the end Prince Bahman Mirza was forced into exile and the young heir presumptive reached age of maturity and ascended the Peacock Throne.

Orders and decorations
Bahman Mirza received as well the highest decoration of Persia as of the Russian Empire:
 Order of the Lion and the Sun (neshan-e shir-o-khorshid) 
 Order of the Imperial Effigy (neshan-e temsal-e homayouni)
 Order of St. Andrew.

"The Bahman Mirza Affair"
When in 1873 the European heads of state met in Austria for the World Exhibition in Vienna, Bahman Mirza sent several notes to the foreign monarchs as well as to the German Reichskanzler Prince Otto von Bismarck addressed to the German crown prince Frederick Wilhelm of Prussia to ask for mediation and help to regain six of his confiscated estates. 
Two years later Bahman Mirza asked for a meeting with the Germans during his tour through Europe. Therefore, in October 1875 he corresponded with the German delegation, telling his full story. It even caused a diplomatic affair when Bahman Mirza wanted to visit the crown prince at Neues Palais in Potsdam. Several telegrams between Minister Karl Freiherr von Wilmowski the head of the Kaiser's Privy Civil Council 1869–1888, Major Eduard von Liebenau the personal adjudant to the crown prince, Joseph Maria von Radowitz the Director for Oriental Affairs at the Foreign Office 1873–1875, and Count George Herbert zu Muenster the acting Ambassador to London 1873-1885 investigated and finally confirmed the origin and background of that Persian prince. 
At the end on 25 October 1875 Bahman Mirza had an audience with the German crown prince, who promised support, and again members of his family were reinstated as Princes of Persia and invited to come back.

Family

Wives

Bahman Mirza had 16 wives, mostly from the Qajar aristocracy or local Azerbaijan nobility. There are four categories of consorts, ranking in status and background in the royal harem. A. the royal Qajar princesses, Bahman Mirza's cousins and mothers of his eldest children; B. daughters from Qajar khans as non-Qajar khans from important local families; C. commoners and D. slave girls, who came as concubines to the harem and then raised in status. Some of his permanent wives are known by name:
a) Princess Malek Soltan Khanom Qajar (daughter of Prince Mohammad Taghi Mirza "Hessam os-Saltaneh" 1791–1853, Fath Ali Shah's 7th son by Zeynab Khanom), his direct first cousin and chief wife.
b) Princess Shams-e Jahan Khanom (daughter of Prince Mohammad Reza Mirza "Eftikhar ol-Molk" 1797–1860, Fath Ali Shah's 13th son by Mariam Khanom Gorji.
c) Malek Jahan Khanom Quyunlu (daughter of Mohammad Qoli Khan Qajar by Princess Shirin Jan Khanom, the 29th daughter of Fath Ali Shah).
d) Mehr Farid Khanom Talishinskiya (daughter of Mehdi Qoli Khan and granddaughter of Mir Mostafa Khan of Talysh).
e) Kuchak Barda Khanom (daughter of Qurban Beyg Ghazi).
f) Govad Khanom (a Kurdish girl from Tabriz).
g) Gowhar Khanom (daughter of Ismail Khan Ghazi).
h) Chichek Khanom (another Kurdish from Tabriz).
i) Khandan Khanom Gorji (a Georgian lady from Tiflis).
j) Nush Afarin Khanom Agha-Abdollah (a woman from Shusha and sister to Farkhonda Begom, wife of Prince Shahrokh Mirza), his last wife.

Offspring

Bahman Mirza had 31 sons and 30 daughters. Some of them became ancestors of the Azerbaijani and Russian Qajar families: Persidsky, Bahmanov and Kadjar. 
His 31 sons in order of seniority:
1. (by Malek Soltan Khanom) Prince Anoushiravan Mirza "Zia od-Dowleh" "Amir Touman" (b. 19 Aug 1833 in Ardabil, d. 23 Oct 1899 in Tabriz, following apoplexy and paralysis, bur. at Shusha, Karabagh), 1873 Governor of Turshiz, 1881-1882 Governor of Tabriz, 1884-1886 and 1898-1899 of Semnan, Damghan and Shahrud, 1888-1889 Governor von Borujerd and Lorestan. Direct ancestor of Ali Akbar Bahman and the Bahman family.
2. (by Malek Soltan Khanom) Prince Jalal od-Din Mirza (b. ca. 1836, d. 1870), Major in Russian army, Major-General in Persian army, poet and historian.
3. (by Malek Soltan Khanom) Prince Reza Qoli Mirza (b. 1837 in Iran; d. 1894 in St. Petersburg), General in Russian army.
4. (by Shams-e Jahan Khanom) Prince Shahrokh Mirza (b. 15/09/1844 in Iran, d. 1915 in Baku), Colonel in Russian army.
5. Prince Nasrollah Mirza (b. 1848), Colonel in Nizhny-Novgorod Dragoon regiment, returned to Iran. He had issued.
6. Prince Mohammad Ali Mirza "Sho'a os-Soltan" "Amir Touman" (b. 1849), Commander-in-Chief of the Persian Cossack division in Isfahan.
7. (by Malek Jahan Khanom) Prince Khan Baba Khan Mirza (b. 1849; d. 1926), Colonel in Russian army.
8. (by Mehr Farid Khanom) Prince Abdol Samed Mirza (b. 1851 at Tiflis; d. 1924 at Shusha), Colonel in Russian army.
9. Prince Qoflan Agha Mirza (b. 1851).
10. Prince Aziz Khan Mirza (b. ca. 1851).
11. Prince Mahmoud Mirza (b. ca. 1853), rittmeister in Russian army.
12. (by Mehr Farid Khanom) Prince Amir Kazem Mirza (b. 1853; d. 1920), Major-General in Russian army.
13. (by Kuchek Barda Khanom) Prince Ali Qoli Mirza (b. 1854; d. 1905).
14. Prince Baha od-Din Mirza (b. 20/7/1855). 
15. Prince Heydar Qoli Mirza (b. 15/8/1855; d. 1918).
16. (by Kuchek Barda Khanom) Prince Khan Jahan Mirza (b. ca. 1855), Colonel in Russian army.
17. (by Chichek Khanom) Prince Amanollah Khan Mirza (b. 8/1/1857 in Shusha; d. 1937 in Tehran), Major-General in Russian army, deputy division commander in Azerbaijan army, returned to Iran and became instructor of the Persian army.
18. Prince Ilkhani Mirza (b. 1858, d. 1901). 
19. Prince Homayoun Mirza (b. 1860).
20. Prince Seyfollah Mirza (b. 6/3/1864; d. 1926), Colonel in Russian army, later served as the chief of intendant service in the army of Azerbaijan
21. (by Mehr Farid Khanom) Prince Amirkhan Mirza (b. ca. 1864).
22. (by Kuchek Barda Khanom) Prince Imamverdi Mirza (b. ca. 1864), returned to Iran.
23. (by Kuchek Barda Khanom) Prince Khan Alam Mirza (b. ca. 1865).
24. Prince Allahverdi Mirza (b. ca. 1866).
25. (by Kuchek Barda Khanom) Prince Keyqobad Mirza (1867-1923).
26. (by Chickek Khanom) Prince Qolam Shah Mirza (b. 1867; d. 1918).
27. (by Chichek Khanom) Prince Shah Qoli Mirza (b. 1871).
28. (by Chichek Khanom) Prince Mohammad Mirza Qajar aka Mamed Qoli Mirza (b. 1872; d. 1920), Major-General in Russian army.
29. (by Kuchek Barda Khanom) Prince Ardashir Mirza (b. 1875).
30. Prince Seyf ol-Malek Mirza.  
31. (by Khandan Khanom) Prince Sahebgharan Mirza, returned to Iran and became 1903 Chamberlain-in-Control of Muzaffar al-Din Shah.

His daughters known by name in order of seniority:
1. (by Malek Soltan Khanom) Princess Mariyam Saltanat Khanom (b. 1836; d. 27 Feb 1866).
2. Princess Azari Homayoun Khanom "Shahzadeh Khanom" (b. ca. 1838).
3. (by Shams-e Jahan Khanom) Princess Rowshandeh Soltan Khanom (b. ca. 1846).
4. Princess Qizikhanim Khanom "Tadj ol-Molouk" (b. 1847 in Tabriz).
5. Princess Sabiyeh Khanom, founder of the Nizamiyeh Pushkin Library in Ganja.
6. Princess Nawab Agha Khanom. 
7. Princess Malek-Sifagh Khanom.
8. (by Mehr Farid Khanom) Princess Zarri Khanom (b. 1864; d. 1943). 
9. (by Mehr Farid Khanom) Princess Khorshid Khanom.
10. (by Mehr Farid Khanom) Princess Khanzadeh Khanom.
11. Princess Keykab Khanom. 
12. (by Mehr Farid Khanom) Princess Abbaseh Khanom (b. 6 Oct 1865).
13. Princess Noor Jahan Khanom (b. 1868; d. 1955).
14. Princess Turan Khanom. 
15. (by Kuchek Barda Khanom) Princess Ashraf Khanom.
16. (by Kuchek Barda Khanom) Princess Manzar Khanom.
17. (by Kuchek Barda Khanom) Princess Bahdjat Khanom.
18. (by Kuchek Barda Khanom) Princess Noor al-Ain Khanom.
19. (by Kuchek Barda Khanom) Princess Firuzeh Khanom. 
20. Princess Fakhr os-Soltan Khanom.
21. Princess Shahzdi Khanom.

Some of Bahman Mirza's remarkable sons and grandsons in recent Iranian, Russian and Azerbaijani history
Reza Qoli Mirza, the Tsar's fliegel-adjutant, who arranged the family's return to Iran with his cousin Nasir al-Din Shah.
Mahmoud Mirza, who participated in the Russian-Japanese war in 1905 and moved from Nizhny Novgorod to Iran to train the Persian army.
Mohammad Ali Mirza "Sho’a os-Soltan", "Amir Touman" and commander-in-chief of the Cossack division in Isfahan.
Seyf od-Din Mirza "Ehtebar ol-Molk", son of Mahmoud Mirza, a high-ranking official in the Ministry of Foreign Affairs and confidant of Ahmad Shah Qajar, Dr. Mohammad Mossadegh and Rahimzadeh Safavi. 
Khosrow Mirza Bahman, son of Amanollah Mirza, graduated the University of St. Petersburg as engineer, one of the founding members and leading employees of the Iranian Railway System.
Parvis Mirza Bahman, son of Amanollah Mirza, engineer and another founding member and leading employee of the Iranian Railway System. 
Dr. Hamid Mirza Bahman, son of Mohammad Mirza, a popular lawyer.
H.E. Ali Akbar Bahman, Iranian Minister of Trade and Commerce, Ambassador to Egypt and to Afghanistan and high-ranking employee of the Ministry of Foreign Affairs.
Ali Asghar Bahman, high-ranking employee in the Ministry of Post, Telegraph and Telephone.
Dr. Abbas Mirza Bahman, long-time president of the Basketball-Federation.
Asghar Mirza Bahman-Ghajar, poet and researcher in the course of agriculture and authorised expert for the Ministry of Justice.
Feyzullah Mirza Qajar, major-general in the Russian imperial army, and commander of Ganja garrison in the army of Azerbaijan Democratic Republic.

References

Sources

External links
The Bahman (Qajar) Ancestors
International Qajar Studies Association

Bahman Mirza
1810 births
1883 deaths
Politicians from Tehran
19th-century Iranian politicians
Iranian emigrants to the Russian Empire
Nobility from the Russian Empire
History of Azerbaijan (Iran)
History of Ardabil
Qajar governors
History of Tehran
History of Hamadan Province
Bahmani family